Year 419 (CDXIX) was a common year starting on Wednesday (link will display the full calendar) of the Julian calendar. At the time, it was known as the Year of the Consulship of Monaxius and Plinta (or, less frequently, year 1172 Ab urbe condita). The denomination 419 for this year has been used since the early medieval period, when the Anno Domini calendar era became the prevalent method in Europe for naming years.

Events 
 By place 

 Byzantine Empire 

 A law is passed, making it illegal for anybody in the Western or Eastern Roman Empires, to instruct barbarians in the art of shipbuilding.

 China 
 Jin Gongdi, age 33, succeeds his developmentally disabled brother Jin Andi as emperor of the Eastern Jin Dynasty. Andi is strangled by orders of the warlord Liu Yu.

Births 
 July 2 – Valentinian III, emperor of the Western Roman Empire (d. 455)

Deaths 
 Jin Andi, emperor of the Eastern Jin Dynasty (b. 382)

References